Pa Tum is a tambon (subdistrict) of Phrao District, in Chiang Mai Province, Thailand. In 2020 it had a total population of 5,228 people.

Administration

Central administration
The tambon is subdivided into 12 administrative villages (muban).

Local administration
The whole area of the subdistrict is covered by the subdistrict municipality (Thesaban Tambon) Pa Tum (เทศบาลตำบลป่าตุ้ม).

References

External links
Thaitambon.com on Pa Tum

Tambon of Chiang Mai province
Populated places in Chiang Mai province